Kingdom of Contradiction is the fourth studio album by Dutch band Intwine. It was released on August 14, 2009 by German record label Tiefdruck-Musik/Universal.

Track listing
All songs written by Intwine, except where noted.
"Cookie Jar" – 5:02
"Cut Me Loose" – 3:50
"Feel It" – 2:58
"Perfect" – 3:13
"For Goodness Sake" – 4:53
"Ravenclaw" (Intwine/Michael Maidwell) – 3:38
"Solo" – 3:36
"No Ones" (Intwine/Maidwell) – 3:48
"Glory" – 4:48
"Abyss" – 5:17
"Walking on the Moon" (feat. Sarah Bettens) (Sting) – 4:17
"Sorry" – 3:37
"Cruel Man" – 3:37
"Sleep in Silence" (Intwine/Maidwell) – 4:55
"Slow Down" – 3:12
"You" – 10:17
 contains an acoustic version of "No Ones" as a hidden track

Personnel
Band members
Roger Peterson – vocals
Jacob Streefkerk – guitar 
Jon Symons – guitar  
Eric Spring in 't Veld – drums
Pablo Penton – bass guitar

Additional personnel
Sarah Bettens – vocals on "Walking on the Moon"
Jochem Jacobs – production

2009 albums
Intwine albums